The Machine to Kill Bad People (Italian: La Macchina ammazzacattivi) is a 1952 Italian fantasy comedy film directed by Roberto Rossellini and featuring Marilyn Buferd, William Tubbs and Clara Bindi. It is part of the tradition of neorealism of the post-war years. Having helped neorealism gain international recognition with his 1945 work Rome, Open City, Rossellini was trying to branch out into different styles.

Production
Rossellini began shooting the film in 1948, but production was beset by many problems. Location shooting took place around Amalfi, Salerno and Trani.

Synopsis
A stranger claiming to be Saint Andrea gives to the village photographer a magic camera with the power to destroy the wicked. When it becomes apparent that no one is immune the photographer turns the device on the giver, who is unmasked as a devil and forced to return everyone to life.

Cast
Gennaro Pisano as Celestino
Marilyn Buferd as American tourist
William Tubbs as American tourist
Helen Tubbs as American tourist
Giovanni Amato as Mayor
Clara Bindi as Giulietta Del Bello
Giacomo Furia as Romano 
Aldo Giuffrè 
Carlo Giuffrè

References

Bibliography
 Peter, Bondanella. The Films of Roberto Rossellini. Cambridge University Press, 1993.
 Brunette, Peter. Roberto Rossellini. University of California Press, 1996.
 Nowell-Smith, Geoffrey . The Companion to Italian Cinema. Cassell, 1996.
 Wagstaff, Christopher. Italian Neorealist Cinema: An Aesthetic Approach. University of Toronto Press, 2007.

External links
 
 Review Essay https://www.academia.edu/3379967/The_Machine_that_Kills_Bad_People

1952 films
1950s Italian-language films
Films directed by Roberto Rossellini
Commedia all'italiana
1950s fantasy comedy films
Italian fantasy comedy films
1952 comedy films
Films scored by Renzo Rossellini
Italian black-and-white films
1950s Italian films